Jermaine Marcel Clark (born September 29, 1976) is a former Major League Baseball player who played for several teams between 2001 and 2005.

Amateur career
A native of Berkeley, California, Clark attended Will C. Wood High School and the University of San Francisco. In 1996, he played collegiate summer baseball with the Chatham A's of the Cape Cod Baseball League, where he was a league all-star, helped lead the team to the league championship, and was named co-MVP of the league's playoffs. Clark was selected by the Seattle Mariners in the 5th round of the 1997 MLB Draft.

Professional career
His major league debut came on April 3, with the Detroit Tigers. In his major league career, he also played for the Texas Rangers, San Diego Padres, Cincinnati Reds, and Oakland Athletics. He played second base and all three outfield positions in his 46-game career, but he only managed to hit .154 during his time in the big leagues.

Scouting & coaching career
After his playing career ended, Clark has worked as a scout for the Oakland Athletics, and an assistant coach for Fresno State University's baseball team. He is currently the Northern California area scout for the Colorado Rockies.

References

External links

1976 births
Living people
African-American baseball players
Cincinnati Reds players
Texas Rangers players
Oakland Athletics players
San Diego Padres players
Detroit Tigers players
Oakland Athletics scouts
Major League Baseball outfielders
Baseball players from California
Major League Baseball second basemen
Everett AquaSox players
Wisconsin Timber Rattlers players
Lancaster JetHawks players
New Haven Ravens players
Tacoma Rainiers players
Oklahoma RedHawks players
Portland Beavers players
Louisville Bats players
Sacramento River Cats players
Nashville Sounds players
San Francisco Dons baseball players
Chatham Anglers players
21st-century African-American sportspeople
20th-century African-American sportspeople